Jennifer Gong-Gershowitz is a Democratic member of the Illinois House of Representatives for the 17th district. The 17th district includes all or parts of Evanston, Glenview, Golf, Morton Grove, Northbrook, Skokie and Wilmette.

Electoral career
Gong-Gershowitz received the Democratic nomination in the election to succeed Rep. Laura Fine, who was not seeking re-election and instead running for Illinois State Senate. Gong-Gershowitz won the 2018 general election with 69.2% of the vote and was re-elected in 2020. She was sworn in to her second term in 2021. She is the second Chinese American to serve in the Illinois General Assembly after Theresa Mah.

Illinois House of Representatives

Committees
Gong-Gershowitz currently serves on four committees: the Immigration & Human Rights committee; the Energy & Environment committee; the Judiciary - Civil committee; and the Mental Health & Addiction committee. Additionally, she is the chairperson for both the Immigration & Human Rights committee and the Judiciary - Civil committee.

Legislation
Gong-Gershowitz has introduced several bills that have gone on to become law. This includes HB0376, which requires Illinois schools to create a unit of curriculum dedicated to studying Asian-American history, as well as HB0709, which required the Illinois Department of Human Services "to conduct a public information campaign to educate immigrants, refugees, asylum seekers, and other noncitizens residing in Illinois of their rights under the U.S. Constitution and Illinois laws that apply regardless of immigration status."

Personal life
Gong-Gershowitz resides in Glenview with her husband and three sons. She is a human rights attorney by trade.

Electoral history

References

External links
 Representative Jennifer Gong-Gershowitz (D) at the Illinois General Assembly
 Legislative website
 Campaign website

Year of birth missing (living people)
21st-century American women politicians
Asian-American state legislators in Illinois
Women state legislators in Illinois
21st-century American politicians
Living people
Democratic Party members of the Illinois House of Representatives